The Time and the Place: The Lost Concert is a live album by Art Farmer's Quintet recorded at the Museum of Modern Art in 1966 and released on the Mosaic label in 2007. The album is taken from a concert originally intended for release as The Time and the Place on Columbia Records in 1967 which was replaced by studio recordings with overdubbed applause. Three tracks from the concert were previously released on an expanded 2LP edition of The Time and the Place in 1982.

Reception
The Allmusic review awarded the album 4 stars stating "A worthy addition, and not a footnote, to the great discography of Art Farmer, Mosaic and Michael Cuscuna deserve big kudos for unearthing this heretofore hidden treasure".

Track listing
 "On the Trail" (Ferde Grofé) - 10:09   
 Band Announcement - 0:41   
 "Far Away Lands" (Jimmy Heath) - 6:46   
 "The Shadow of Your Smile" (Johnny Mandel, Paul Francis Webster) - 14:33   
 "Dailey Bread" (Albert Dailey) - 12:02 Previously released on 2LP reissue of The Time and the Place   
 "Blue Bossa" (Kenny Dorham) - 8:02 Previously released on 2LP reissue of The Time and the Place     
 "Is That So?" (Duke Pearson) - 9:06 Previously released on 2LP reissue of The Time and the Place     
 "The Time and the Place" (Heath) - 10:47

Personnel
Art Farmer - flugelhorn
Jimmy Heath - tenor saxophone  
Albert Dailey - piano
Walter Booker - bass
Mickey Roker - drums

References

Mosaic Records live albums
Art Farmer live albums
2007 live albums
Albums produced by Michael Cuscuna
Albums recorded at the Museum of Modern Art